Robert McGregor (born 16 June 1972) is an Australian modern pentathlete. He competed in the men's individual event at the 2000 Summer Olympics.

References

External links
 

1972 births
Living people
Australian male modern pentathletes
Olympic modern pentathletes of Australia
Modern pentathletes at the 2000 Summer Olympics
Sportspeople from Brisbane